Baron Moritz von Cohn (19 September 1812 - 29 April 1900) was a German-Jewish private banker.

Cohn was born in Wörlitz. As the proprietor of a private bank in Dessau, he advanced to be court-banker to the dukes of Anhalt and also over several decades administered the private fortune of the Prussian crown prince and later emperor Wilhelm I.  He thus also made himself a strong financier of the capital for railroad construction, then developing in Germany.  He died in Dessau, aged 87.

Bibliography
  Erik Lindner: Ein „Edelmann aus Dessau“. Bankier Moritz von Cohn als Hofbankier in Anhalt und Preußen. In: Sachsen-Anhalt: Beiträge zur Landesgeschichte. Halle, Jg. 4 (1996). S. 59-79
  Erik Lindner: Baron Moritz von Cohn: Privat- und Hofbankier in Dessau und Berlin. In: Erhard Hirsch (Hrsg.): Dessau-Wörlitz-Beiträge VIII: 1. Dessauer Gespräche. Gesellschaft - Religion - Wissenschaft - Kultur. Dessau, 1998. S. 19-22
  Erik Lindner: Baron Moritz von Cohn: ein jüdischer Bankier aus Dessau. Stadtarchiv Dessau, Dessau 2004. 

1812 births
1900 deaths
19th-century German Jews
Court Jews
German bankers
People from Wörlitz
19th-century German businesspeople